The 1934 New Hampshire gubernatorial election was held on November 6, 1934. Republican nominee Styles Bridges defeated Democratic nominee John L. Sullivan with 50.55% of the vote.

Primary elections
Primary elections were held on September 11, 1934.

Democratic primary

Candidates
John L. Sullivan
Eaton D. Sargent
George H. Duncan

Results

Republican primary

Candidates
Styles Bridges, New Hampshire Public Service Commissioner
Charles E. Carroll

Results

General election

Candidates
Major party candidates
Styles Bridges, Republican
John L. Sullivan, Democratic

Other candidates
Eli Bourdon, Socialist
Elba K. Chase, Communist

Results

References

1934
New Hampshire
Gubernatorial